Lados B (B Sides) is a compilation album released on December 16, 2003, by Guatemalan singer-songwriter Ricardo Arjona.

Reception 

The Allmusic review by Jason Birchmeier awarded the album 2 stars stating "This compilation is a misleading entry point into Arjona's catalog. Neophytes are better off starting with either the subsequently released greatest-hits compilations Quién Dijo Ayer (2007) and Simplemente lo Mejor (2008) or else Historias, which many fans consider to be Arjona's finest album, and then moving on to Si el Norte Fuera el Sur and Sin Daños a Terceros before going backward to Animal Nocturno."

Track listing 
All tracks by Ricardo Arjona

 "Sólo Quería Un Café" (I Just Wanted A Coffee) – 3:51
 "Tarde (Sin Daños a Terceros)" (Late (Without Harm to Thirds)) – 4:16
 "Animal Nocturno" (Nocturnal Animal) – 3:54
 "Aún Te Amo (Carta Nro. 1)" (I Still Love You (Letter No. 1)) – 3:33
 "Ayúdame Freud" (Help Me Freud) – 6:42
 "Del Otro Lado del Sol" (From The Other Side of The Sun) – 4:43
 "Lo Poco Que Queda de Mí (Acoustic Version)" (What Little Is Left Of Me) – 4:34
 "Receta (Acoustic Version)" (Prescription) – 4:53
 "Duerme" (Sleep) – 5:04
 "Vientre de Cuna" (Womb's a cradle) – 3:27
 "Abarrotería de Amor" (Grocery Store of Love) – 3:41
 "Pensar En Ti (Acoustic Version)" (Think of You) – 4:06
 "Tú" (You) – 4:28
 "A Cara o Cruz (Spanish Version)" (Head or Tails) – 3:42

Personnel 
Roberto Arballo – arranger
Ricardo Arjona – vocals, producer
Joe Caldas – engineer
Julio Chavez – recording assistant
Mario DeJesús – engineer
Isaias Garcia – engineer, mixing
Sergio George – arranger, musical direction
Gerardo Lopez – engineer
Fernando Muscolo – arranger, keyboard programming
Angel "Cucco" Peña – arranger, producer
Gabriel Peña – production assistant
Joe Pujals – arranger
Héctor Ivan Rosa – engineer
Humberto Soto – production assistant
Miguel Angel "Matin" Villagran – arranger
Sterling Winfield – recording assistant
Ben Wisch – engineer

Sales and certifications

References

External links 
 http://www.ricardoarjona.com/

2003 compilation albums
Ricardo Arjona compilation albums
B-side compilation albums
Sony Discos compilation albums
Spanish-language compilation albums